Great Belize Television, or as it is locally known, Channel 5, is a Belize City-based local television station established in December 1991. Channel 5 airs mostly American and Caribbean programs, as well as a variety of locally produced programs. It is a subsidiary of Great Belize Productions, a local production company established in 1982.

Channel 5 is affiliated with the Caribbean Broadcasting Union and its subsidiary the Caribbean Media Corporation.

Channel 5 has produced such popular programs as "Lauren Da Mawnin", "The Andy Palacio Show" and most recently Karaoke Television.

Channel 5's general manager following its parent company's sale to Belize Telemedia is Amalia Mai, a veteran journalist She succeeds Stewart Krohn, also a veteran journalist.

History 
Great Belize Productions, the parent company of Channel 5, received its broadcast license from the Government of Belize in 1991 and began broadcasting on December 9 of that year. Beginning in 1992, Channel 5 advertised a weekly schedule of programming in the Amandala (later shifted to The Belize Times before being discontinued after 2003). In January 1998, Channel 5 launched its website channel5belize.com, which featured text transcripts for News 5 and video streaming of the newscast. Channel 5, as the Belize representative of the CBU, has won numerous journalism awards at home and abroad.

News 5 

Channel 5's News Department produces News 5 Live for broadcast every weeknight (there are no weekend newscasts). The program has been the flagship of Channel Five since it premiered on December 9, 1991 and is now Belize's longest running television program. The program runs for 90 minutes including commercials (during election season it may be slightly longer). when the news starts with the line "Tonight on News 5 Live" and The show usually closes with the line "And that's the news!", followed by a plug for the station's website.

Local Programs broadcast by Channel 5: Past and Present 
 The Andy Palacio Show (Palacio also wrote the theme for News 5 Live; discussed local music)
 Lauren Da Mawnin (short-lived morning program featuring comic Lauren Burgess; spawned primetime Sunday program spinoff Lauren Da Nite)
 One on One (featured Stuart Leslie and Dickie Bradley; talk)
 Karaoke Television
 Duets (a musical competition featuring two people performing a musical act. The grand prize is $10,000 BZD.)
 KTV Duets (a spoof of KTV and Duets)
 Noh Matta Wat! (produced by 13 Productions; co-broadcast with Channel 7 and Krem TV)
 Gimme 5! (special promotion, held every year for one week celebrating the yearly anniversary.)
 Hurricane Iris: After the Storm (compilation of news stories on the hurricane; VHS)
 The Land of Belize (host Therese Rath, discusses Belize's geography; VHS)
 The Sea of Belize (host Tom Greenwood, discusses Belize's marine ecosystems and resources; VHS)
 Belize: The Maya Heritage (host Froyla Salam, discusses the first settlers of Belize; VHS)
 From Invasion to Nation: A History of Belize (based on Assad Shoman's 13 Chapters of a History of Belize; VHS)
 Be the Next Superstar (a talent competition.)
 KTV the Remix (a reboot of KTV)

Note: Channel 5 sells tapes of in-house produced programs at its office.

References

External links 
 Official Site

Television stations in Belize
Television channels and stations established in 1991
1991 establishments in Belize